Lepturges pictus is a species of longhorn beetle of the subfamily Lamiinae. It was described by John Lawrence LeConte in 1852.

References

Lepturges
Beetles described in 1852